R-12.1 regional road is a Montenegrin roadway. It serves as connection from R-12 regional road to Petnjica

History

In November 2019, the Government of Montenegro published bylaw on categorisation of state roads. With new categorisation, R-12.1 regional road was created from municipal road.

Major intersections

References

R-12.1